The Continental Cup 2002–03 was the sixth edition of the IIHF Continental Cup. The season started on September 20, 2002, and finished on January 12, 2003.

The tournament was won by Jokerit, who beat Lokomotiv Yaroslavl in the final.

Preliminary round

Group A
(Barcelona, Spain)

Group A standings

Group B
(Amsterdam, Netherlands)

Group B standings

Group C
(Gheorgheni, Romania)

Group C standings

Group D
(Belgrade, FR Yugoslavia)

Group D standings

Group E
(Székesfehérvár, Hungary)

Group E standings

First Group Stage

Group F
(Rouen, France)

*: Games were suspended because of electric failure; and were never played

Group F standings +

+:  Ayr Scottish Eagles went bankrupt before the next round was played, then  Dragons de Rouen took their place

Group G
(Linz, Austria)

Group G standings

Group H
(Liepāja, Latvia)

Group H standings

Group I
(Oświęcim, Poland)

Group I standings

 Belfast Giants,
 Vålerenga,
 AS Asiago,
 HDD Olimpija Ljubljana,
 Keramin Minsk,
 HC Slovan Bratislava,
 Sokil Kiev,
 EC Villacher SV    :  bye

Second Group Stage

Group J
(Belfast, United Kingdom)

Group J standings

Group K
(Asiago, Italy)

Group K standings

Group L
(Bratislava, Slovakia)

Group L standings

 HC Milano Vipers,
 Jokerit,
 Lokomotiv Yaroslavl,
 HC Davos,
 HC Lugano    :  bye

Third Stage

Group M
(Lugano, Switzerland)

Group M Semifinals

Group M Third Place

Group M Final

Group N
(Milan, Italy)

Group N Semifinals

Group N Third Place

Group N Final

Final stage
(Lugano, Switzerland) & (Milan, Italy)

Seventh place match

Fifth place match

Third place match

Final

References
 Continental Cup 2003

2002–03 in European ice hockey
IIHF Continental Cup